Araceli Velázquez Ramírez (born 4 December 1961) is a Mexican politician affiliated with the Institutional Revolutionary Party. As of 2014 she served as Deputy of the LIX Legislature of the Mexican Congress representing Hidalgo as replacement of Jorge Romero Romero.

References

1961 births
Living people
Politicians from Hidalgo (state)
Women members of the Chamber of Deputies (Mexico)
Institutional Revolutionary Party politicians
National Autonomous University of Mexico alumni
21st-century Mexican politicians
21st-century Mexican women politicians
Members of the Congress of Hidalgo
Deputies of the LIX Legislature of Mexico
Members of the Chamber of Deputies (Mexico) for Hidalgo (state)